Joel Mero (born 7 February 1995), is a Finnish former professional football defender. He has represented the Finland national under-21 football team. Mero was born in Turku, Finland. Mero began his senior club career playing for FC Lahti, before signing with Borussia Mönchengladbach at age 18 in 2013.

Club career

FC Lahti

Mero made his Veikkausliiga debut in June 2012 in a match against Haka. During seasons 2012 and 2013 he made 26 appearances for FC Lahti and scored two goals.

Borussia Monchengladbach II

On 22 April 2013, it was announced that Borussia Mönchengladbach had signed Mero on a four-year contract, with the young Finn joining the club during the summer 2013.

SJK Seinäjoki

SJK Seinäjoki published on 3 July 2017 that it had signed Mero.

International career 
Mero was a regular in the Finland national under-21 football team and has a total of 32 caps in international junior matches.

Career statistics

Club

Honours and achievements

Club
FC Lahti
Finnish League Cup: 2013

Borussia Mönchengladbach II
Regionalliga West: 2014–15

References

External links

 
 

1995 births
Living people
Finnish footballers
Finland youth international footballers
Finland under-21 international footballers
Finnish expatriate footballers
FC Lahti players
Borussia Mönchengladbach II players
Kotkan Työväen Palloilijat players
Reipas Lahti players
Seinäjoen Jalkapallokerho players
HIFK Fotboll players
Regionalliga players
Veikkausliiga players
Kakkonen players
Association football defenders
Expatriate footballers in Germany
Finnish expatriate sportspeople in Germany
Footballers from Turku